Judith Solveig Seitzberg Andersen-Lyster (born 16 November 1951) is a Danish rower. She competed in the women's quadruple sculls event at the 1976 Summer Olympics.

References

External links
 

1951 births
Living people
Danish female rowers
Olympic rowers of Denmark
Rowers at the 1976 Summer Olympics
Rowers from Copenhagen